Scirpophaga tongyaii is a moth in the family Crambidae. It was described by Angoon Lewvanich in 1981. It is found in China (Hainan, Yunnan), India, Myanmar and Thailand.

References

Moths described in 1981
Schoenobiinae
Moths of Asia